Daryl Christine Hannah (born December 3, 1960) is an American actress and environmental activist. She made her screen debut in Brian De Palma's supernatural horror film The Fury (1978). She has starred in various movies across the years, including as Pris Stratton in Ridley Scott's science fiction thriller Blade Runner (1982) and as Cathy Featherstone in Randal Kleiser's romantic comedy Summer Lovers (1982), as the mermaid Madison in Ron Howard's fantasy-romantic comedy Splash (1984), Roxanne Kowalski in the romantic comedy Roxanne (1987), Darien Taylor in Oliver Stone's drama Wall Street (1987), and Annelle Dupuy Desoto in the comedy-drama Steel Magnolias (1989). In 2004, Hannah won a Saturn Award for her role as one-eyed assassin Elle Driver in Quentin Tarantino's two-part martial arts action film Kill Bill. In 2015, she appeared in the Netflix series Sense8 as Angelica Turing.

Early life
Hannah was born in Chicago, Illinois, to Susan Jeanne Metzger, a producer and former schoolteacher, and Donald Christian Hannah, a tugboat and barge company owner. Her parents divorced, and her mother subsequently married businessman Jerrold Wexler, brother of cinematographer Haskell Wexler. Hannah grew up with siblings Don and Page Hannah and her maternal half-sister, Tanya Wexler, in Long Grove, Illinois. She was raised Roman Catholic.

Hannah became interested in movies at a young age, partly due to insomnia. She has said that she was very shy growing up. As a young child, Hannah was emotionally isolated and struggled in school. She was subsequently diagnosed with autism, and medical professionals urged her parents to have her institutionalized and medicated. Instead, her mother decided to relocate with Hannah temporarily to Jamaica, in hopes that the change in environment would help her daughter. Hannah later attended the progressive Francis W. Parker School in Chicago before enrolling at the University of Southern California in Los Angeles, where she studied ballet and acting.

Career

1970s
Hannah made her film debut at age 18 in 1978 with an appearance in Brian De Palma's horror film The Fury.

1980s

Hannah had an early role along with Rachel Ward in the 1983 horror film The Final Terror. The film was shot in 1981, but was released in 1983.

Hannah played the acrobatic and violent replicant Pris in Ridley Scott's science fiction classic Blade Runner (1982), in which she performed some of her own gymnastic stunts. That same year, she appeared in the summer hit release Summer Lovers. Her role as a mermaid in Ron Howard's  hit fantasy/comedy Splash (1984), opposite Tom Hanks brought her much recognition. Also in 1984, she appeared in The Pope of Greenwich Village, co-starring with Mickey Rourke and Eric Roberts.
In 1985, Hannah appeared in and provided backing vocals in the music video "You're a Friend of Mine", performed by Clarence Clemons and Jackson Browne. She also appeared in the music video for Browne's "Tender Is the Night". Hannah's other roles during the 1980s included the film version of the best seller The Clan of the Cave Bear (1986) and Legal Eagles (1986) starring Robert Redford and Debra Winger. She appeared in the Academy Award winning Wall Street (1987), for which she received a Razzie Award. Hannah starred in the title role of Fred Schepisi's film Roxanne (1987), a modern retelling of Edmond Rostand's play Cyrano de Bergerac. Her performance was described as "sweet" and "gentle" by film critic Roger Ebert. She also starred in High Spirits (1988) opposite Peter O'Toole and ended the decade with Woody Allen's Crimes and Misdemeanors (1989) and Steel Magnolias featuring Sally Field, Shirley MacLaine and Julia Roberts (1989).

1990s
Hannah played the daughter of Jack Lemmon's character in both of the Grumpy Old Men comedies. That same year, she played Nancy Archer in the HBO comedy remake of Attack Of The Fifty-Foot Woman. In 1995, Hannah was chosen by Empire magazine as No. 96 of the "100 Sexiest Stars in Film History." That year she appeared as homicidal sociopath Leann Netherwood in The Tie That Binds. She also starred in the 1998 direct-to-video film Addams Family Reunion playing Morticia Addams.

2000s

Hannah played Elle Driver, a one-eyed assassin, in Kill Bill (2003), directed by Quentin Tarantino. Her performance in this film and her appearances in Speedway Junky (1999), Dancing at the Blue Iguana (2000), A Walk to Remember (2002), Northfork (2003), Casa de los Babys (2003) and Silver City (2004), have been described by some reviewers as a comeback. After Kill Bill, she appeared in several TV films and miniseries, including the Syfy original film Shark Swarm, Final Days of Planet Earth for the Hallmark Channel, and Kung Fu Killer for Spike. She also appeared in Shannon's Rainbow and The Cycle in 2009.

2010s
In the 2010s, Hannah appeared in several films, including A Closed Book and Eldorado. Robert Koehler of Variety wrote of A Closed Book that it allows curious fans to see what Hannah has been up to lately. In 2013, she starred in Zombie Night, a Syfy original film by The Asylum as well as in TV movie Social Nightmare (a.k.a. Mother: She'll Keep You Safe), a thriller by The Asylum about internet bullying. In 2013, she joined Skin Traffik, and, in 2014, she signed on to Signs of Death.

Beginning in 2015, Hannah portrayed Angelica Turing in Sense8, a series on Netflix from the Wachowskis. The series ran for two seasons, with a final episode released on June 8, 2018. Also in 2018, Hannah released Paradox, for which she served as writer and producer; the film featured musician Neil Young.

2020s
In 2020, Hannah starred in The Now, a comedy series for The Roku Channel opposite Dave Franco.

In 2023 she was nominated for a Grammy Award for best Music film.

Theatre
Hannah is also an accomplished theater actress, reprising Marilyn Monroe's starring role in The Seven Year Itch in 2000 in London's West End. Reviews of the play commended Hannah's performance, with Lizzie Loveridge of Curtain Up! saying that the play was the "perfect vehicle" for Hannah to "show her talents as a comedienne."

Other work
Hannah wrote, directed and produced a short film titled The Last Supper. She directed, produced, and was cinematographer for the documentary Strip Notes, which was broadcast on Channel 4 in the UK and on HBO and documented the research Hannah did for her role as a stripper in Dancing at the Blue Iguana.

In 2002, Hannah appeared in Robbie Williams' video for the song "Feel" portraying Williams' love interest.

Hannah and actress Hilary Shepard Turner created two board games, Love It or Hate It and LIEbrary, with Hannah previewing the latter on The Ellen DeGeneres Show in 2005.

Political activism

Hannah, an active environmentalist, created her own weekly video blog called DHLoveLife on sustainable solutions. She is often the sound recordist, camera person and on-screen host for the blog. As of 2006, her home—which was built with green materials—ran on solar power, and she drove a car that ran on biodiesel. She has been vegetarian since age 11, and later became vegan. In late 2006, she volunteered to act as a judge for Treehugger.com's "Convenient Truths" contest.

On June 13, 2006, Hannah was arrested, along with actor Taran Noah Smith, for her involvement with over 350 farmers, their families and supporters, confronting authorities trying to bulldoze the largest urban farm in the U.S., located in South Central Los Angeles. She chained herself to a walnut tree at the South Central Farm for three weeks to protest against the farmers' eviction by the property's new owner, Ralph Horowitz. The farm had been established in the wake of the 1992 L.A. riots to allow people in the city to grow food for themselves. However, Horowitz, who had paid $5 million for it, sought to evict the farmers to build a warehouse. He had asked for $16 million to sell it but turned down the offer when the activists raised that amount after the established deadline. Hannah was interviewed via cell phone shortly before she was arrested, along with 44 other protesters, and said that she and the others are doing the "morally right thing". She spent some time in jail.

Hannah has also worked to help end sexual slavery and has traveled around the world to make a documentary.

Hannah was among 31 people arrested on June 23, 2009, in a protest against mountaintop removal in southern West Virginia, part of a wider campaign to stop the practice in the region. The protesters, who also included NASA climate scientist James E. Hansen, were charged with obstructing officers and impeding traffic after they sat in the middle of State Route 3 outside Massey Energy's Goals Coal preparation plant, The Charleston Gazette reported. In a Democracy Now! phone interview on June 24, 2009, Hannah spoke briefly on why she went to West Virginia and risked arrest.

Hannah was arrested on August 30, 2011, in front of the White House as part of a sit-in to protest against the proposed Keystone oil pipeline from Alberta to the U.S. Gulf Coast. In a Huffington Post piece co-authored with Phil Radford, Hannah explained that the purpose of her action was to "shine the light" on the President's decision on the pipeline for "millions of voters" to see. In October 2011, Hannah and other pipeline opponents rode horses and bicycles and walked from the Pine Ridge Indian Reservation to the Rosebud Reservation to protest the project.

Hannah was the executive producer of Greedy Lying Bastards, a 2012 documentary against climate change denial.

In September 2012, Hannah signed environmental activist Tom Weis' open letter calling on President Barack Obama and Governor Mitt Romney to withdraw their support for the construction of the southern leg of the Keystone XL pipeline, that would transport oil sands from Montana to Texas. Other signatories included climate scientist James Hansen and actors Sheryl Lee, Mariel Hemingway, and Ed Begley Jr. On October 4, 2012, Hannah was arrested and jailed in Wood County, Texas, for criminal trespassing. She and a local landowner, 78-year-old Eleanor Fairchild, were arrested while protesting against the TransCanada Keystone XL oil sands pipeline by attempting to block heavy construction equipment. Although they were charged with trespassing, they were in fact protesting on Fairchild's land. On February 13, 2013, Hannah was arrested at the White House along with Robert F. Kennedy Jr. and Conor Kennedy during a climate change protest against the proposed Keystone Pipeline.

On April 26, 2014, in Washington, Hannah and Neil Young led a march by the "Cowboy and Indian Alliance" group against the Obama administration to reject the proposed Keystone Pipeline.

Hannah endorsed Senator Bernie Sanders for president in the 2016 U.S. presidential election.

She is a member of the World Future Council.

Personal life

Hannah had long-term relationships with John F. Kennedy Jr. and musician Jackson Browne. She and Browne began dating in 1983 and broke up in 1992 amid unsubstantiated rumors that Browne had been physically abusive to her. Browne later prevailed in a defamation dispute with Fox Television which issued a retraction. Hannah began a relationship with musician Neil Young in 2014, and they married in 2018.

Hannah was among the numerous women who brought sexual abuse allegations against Harvey Weinstein. In a part of Ronan Farrow's 2017 exposé, Hannah claimed that Weinstein sexually harassed her multiple times during the production of Kill Bill and that he once tried to break into her hotel room. Fearing that he intended to rape her, she fled the room through a fire escape. Hannah later expressed belief that Weinstein sabotaged her career in retaliation for refusing his advances, as she struggled to find work after appearing in Kill Bill.

Filmography

Actress

Film

Television

Director

Theatre

Awards

 Best Fight—MTV Movie Awards Kill Bill: Volume 2, 2005
 Best Supporting Actress—Saturn Award Kill Bill: Volume 2, 2004
 Best Actress—Saturn Award Splash, 1984
 Influencer of the Year Award—National Biodiesel Board, 2004
 Ongoing Commitment Award—Environmental Media Award, 2004
 Environmental Activism – Water Quality Awards, 2006
 Environmental Preservation – Artivist Awards, 2006
 Special golden camera 300 – Manaki Brothers Film Festival, 2010

References

External links

 
 
 
 

20th-century American actresses
21st-century American actresses
21st-century American women writers
Actresses from Chicago
American environmentalists
American social democrats
American film actresses
American voice actresses
American television actresses
American women bloggers
American bloggers
American people of German descent
American rock keyboardists
American Girls (band) members
Catholics from Illinois
Environmental bloggers
Living people
Actors with autism
People from Long Grove, Illinois
Board game designers
University of Southern California alumni
Video bloggers
1960 births

 Francis W. Parker School (Chicago) alumni